Ulysses Paxton is a fictional character created by Edgar Rice Burroughs in his novel The Master Mind of Mars. Within the narrative framework of the novel, Captain Paxton, United States Army Infantry, is a fan of Burroughs' Barsoom series, and after having a shell blow off his legs during trench warfare in World War I, he finds himself drawn across the gulfs of space to Mars (where his body is whole again) like John Carter before him. He sends Burroughs a first person manuscript of his adventures on the dying planet, which Burroughs publishes.

On Mars, Paxton is taken in by elderly mad scientist Ras Thavas, the "Master Mind" of the novel's title, who educates him in the ways of Barsoom and bestows on him the Martian name Vad Varo. Ras has perfected techniques of transplanting brains, which he uses to provide rich elderly Martians with youthful new bodies for a profit. Distrustful of his fellow Martians, he trains Paxton as his assistant to perform the same operation on him. But Paxton has fallen in love with Valla Dia, one of Ras' young victims, whose body has been swapped for that of the hag Xaxa, Jeddara (empress) of the city-state of Phundahl. He refuses to operate on Ras until his mentor promises to restore her to her rightful body. A quest for that body ensues, in which Paxton is aided by others of Ras' experimental victims, and in the end (and after meeting fellow Earthman John Carter) he attains the hand of his Valla Dia, who in a happy plot twist turns out to be a princess.

Further appearances
In the following novel, A Fighting Man of Mars, Paxton relays Tan Hadron of Hastor's adventure to Burroughs on Earth via the Gridley Wave (named after Jason Gridley, a character in Burroughs' Pellucidar series). Paxton is not involved in this story's plot, other than the framing device of transcribing and relaying it.

Paxton is also mentioned at the beginning of Synthetic Men of Mars. When Dejah Thoris is badly injured in an accident and Ras Thavas, the only surgeon that can possibly help her, has gone missing without a trace, John Carter decides to seek out Paxton instead, hoping that, as Ras Thavas' former student, he can perform the surgery. He is however captured by the Hormads before he has a chance to locate Paxton, and Paxton himself is again not involved in the plot.

References

External links
 ERBzine.com Illustrated Bibliography for The Master Mind of Mars
 ERBzine.com Edgar Rice Burroughs Tribute Site
 barsoom.com Edgar Rice Burroughs Mars Site
 Zip file Text file at Project Gutenberg Australia
 Edgar Rice Burroughs Summary Project page for The Master Mind of Mars

Barsoom characters
Characters in written science fiction
Characters in American novels of the 20th century
Literary characters introduced in 1928
Fictional military captains
Fictional United States Army personnel
Fictional World War I veterans